Hannah Allam (born 1977) is an American journalist and reporter.

Biography
Allam was born in Oklahoma to a Muslim family in 1977. Currently working for the Washington Post, Allam has a wide background within MSN outlets. Prior to Washington Post, she was a Washington-based national security correspondent for NPR, focusing on homegrown extremism. Before joining NPR, she was a national correspondent for BuzzFeed News who is based in Washington, DC. Allam was the Middle East Bureau Chief (Baghdad) for McClatchy Newspapers.
  Early in her career, Allam interned for The Washington Post.  She then became a staff reporter for the St. Paul Pioneer Press, from which McClatchy recruited her in 2003 to assist them with, and later to lead, their in-depth coverage of the Iraq War.  She is fluent in English, French, and Arabic.  She was raised in Saudi Arabia and the United Arab Emirates, but she returned to the US to complete high school in Oklahoma, then she majored in journalism and was editor of the student newspaper at the University of Oklahoma.

She was a 2008–2009 Nieman Fellow at Harvard University.

Allam has served as a judge for the American Mosaic Journalism Prize in 2018, 2019, 2021, and 2022.

Awards
 1999, 1998–1999 University of Oklahoma, Division of Student Affairs, CSPA Gold Circle Awards: Personality Profile, first place
 2004, National Association of Black Journalists, 2004 Journalist of the Year Award.
 2006, Overseas Press Club (with two of her Baghdad Bureau colleagues), Hal Boyle Award for best newspaper reporting from abroad for "Iraq: America's Failing War."
 2008–2009, Nieman Fellow at Harvard University
 2009, 30th annual McGill Lecture at the University of Georgia

References

External links
 Hannah Allam page, Palestine: Information with Provenance (PIWP database)
 C-Span video library with Hannah Allam, covers 2005, 2013
 Hannah Allam's Online Photo Journal
 Articles from Baghdad by Hannah Allam
 "working list of female interruptors" (of "the Men-Talk-War fest")..."for a wider, fuller conversation on Iraq"
 http://www.truth-out.org/author/itemlist/user/44680

1977 births
Living people
American newspaper reporters and correspondents
American expatriates in Saudi Arabia
American expatriates in the United Arab Emirates
Iraq War and the media
McClatchy publications
Middle Eastern women
Nieman Fellows
PBS people
University of Oklahoma alumni
American women journalists
American Arabic writers
21st-century American journalists